Carla Somerville (born November 30, 1973, in Calgary, Alberta) is a former field hockey player from Canada, who earned a total number of 97 international caps for the Women's Senior National Team during her career. On national level Somerville, a resident of Edmonton, Alberta, played for Edmonton Women's FHA.

Currently, she is the head coach of the University of Alberta Pandas field hockey team, and is the reigning Canadian Interuniversity Sport Coach of the Year after guiding the Pandas to their first-ever CIS championship in 2005.

International Senior Tournaments
 1995 – Pan American Games, Mar del Plata, Argentina (3rd)
 1995 – Olympic Qualifier, Cape Town, South Africa (7th)
 1997 – World Cup Qualifier, Harare, Zimbabwe (11th)
 1998 – Commonwealth Games, Kuala Lumpur, Malaysia (not ranked)
 1999 – Pan American Games, Winnipeg, Canada (3rd)
 2001 – Pan American Cup, Kingston, Jamaica (3rd)
 2001 – World Cup Qualifier, Amiens/Abbeville, France (10th)

External links
 Profile on Field Hockey Canada

1973 births
Living people
Canadian female field hockey players
Canadian field hockey coaches
Field hockey players at the 1995 Pan American Games
Field hockey players at the 1998 Commonwealth Games
Medalists at the 1995 Pan American Games
Pan American Games bronze medalists for Canada
Pan American Games medalists in field hockey
Sportspeople from Calgary
Sportspeople from Edmonton
Commonwealth Games competitors for Canada